The Long Canyon Village Site is an archaeological site located on the South Fork Kern River in Kern County, California, near the community of South Lake. The village was inhabited by the Tübatulabal people, who used the site as a winter home, until a point between 1780 and 1820. Archaeologists discovered the site in 1948–49. Investigations at the site have found the remnants of homes and granaries.

The site was added to the National Register of Historic Places on April 14, 1980.

References

Further reading
Cuevas, K.M. Archaeological Investigations at The Long Canyon Village Site, CA-KER-311, Kern County, California. Coyote Press.

Former Native American populated places in the Sierra Nevada (United States)
Kern River Valley
History of Kern County, California
Archaeological sites on the National Register of Historic Places in California
National Register of Historic Places in Kern County, California
Populated places on the National Register of Historic Places in California